Teens of Style is the 9th studio album by American indie rock band Car Seat Headrest, released on October 30, 2015. It was their first album recorded for Matador Records. Intended as an introductory compilation for new listeners, it features reworked, newly recorded versions of songs originally released between 2010 and 2012, with the addition of one new composition.

Background and recording 
From the description of the "No Passion" music video, Teens of Style is a collection of older Car Seat Headrest songs, rerecorded in 2015 to make a sonically expanded new release.

From Interview magazine, "At the time that I was originally recording the songs, I don't think I considered them to be the final versions, [...] They were just self-recorded and I wanted to do them properly at some point."

Speaking with Stereogum, Toledo said:
"I’d had the idea for a while, including when I was originally recording them; it felt like the best I could do at the time, rather than something I’d really be happy with forever. That was part of the appeal with digital albums, is that they could feel less ‘official’, and I could mess with them long after their technical release date. I often went back and tweaked stuff on past albums I felt could be better, but I also wanted to do a more comprehensive overhaul of the best of it, to give it new life. And I’d always thought ‘studio’ when thinking of that, but by the time Matador came around I felt I was working well enough in the home environment to do the first album that way, and that’s what ended up happening. Everything on Teens Of Style I recorded and produced myself. We got a professional, Abe Seiferth, to mix the drums and bass for Something Soon, but everything else is me. I figured this would be my last chance to do something that still sounded & felt like the ‘old’ Car Seat Headrest before we started doing bigger work."

Performers on the album include the live lineup from the time of Car Seat Headrest's signing with Matador; Andrew Katz plays drums, and Jacob Bloom plays bass.

Accolades

Track listing

Personnel 
Car Seat Headrest
 Will Toledo – all vocals and instruments except:
 Andrew Katz – drums
 Jacob Bloom – bass

Additional musicians
 Amanda Schiano di Cola – trumpet 
 Eleni Govetas – saxophone 

Production
 Will Toledo – production, mixing
 Abe Seiferth – additional mixing 
 Degnan Smith – East Coast recordings, unsolicited vocals
 Stewart Piccolo – additional dialogues
 JJ Golden – mastering
 Max Wedner – illustration
 Mike Zimmerman – design and colour

Charts

References 

Car Seat Headrest albums
2015 albums
Matador Records albums